The 2005 Anzac Test was a rugby league test match played between Australia and New Zealand at the Suncorp Stadium in Brisbane on 22 April 2005. It was the 6th Anzac test played between the two nations since the first was played under the Super League banner in 1997 and the first to be played in Brisbane.

Squads

Match Summary

References

2005 in Australian rugby league
2005 in New Zealand rugby league
Anzac Test
Rugby league in Brisbane
International rugby league competitions hosted by Australia